Lee Roy Chapman (born 5 December 1959) is an English former professional footballer who played as a striker from 1978 until 1996, in which he scored over 200 first team goals.

He is best known for spells with Stoke City, Leeds United, Sheffield Wednesday, Nottingham Forest and West Ham United. He also played for Plymouth Argyle, Arsenal, Sunderland, Portsmouth, Southend United, Ipswich Town and Swansea City. As well as this he played in both France and Norway for Chamois Niortais and Strømsgodset IF, and was capped by both the England U21 and England B teams. He also won the Football League Cup with Nottingham Forest and the league title with Leeds United. He scored a total of more than 250 goals in all competitions during a club career which lasted for nearly 20 years.

Club career
Chapman was born in Lincoln and began his career at Stoke City. He made his league debut whilst on loan at Plymouth Argyle in 1978–79. He made his debut for Stoke in a League Cup match against Swindon Town with Chapman scoring Stoke's goal in a 2–1 defeat. He soon became a vital player for Stoke top-scoring in both 1980–81 and 1981–82 which prompted Arsenal to pay Stoke £500,000 for his services.

However, the move was not a success – he made only 23 appearances for the club and scored four goals. Chapman moved to Sunderland in December 1983, but again failed to establish himself in the team, scoring just 3 goals in 15 appearances. Howard Wilkinson, then manager of Sheffield Wednesday, signed Chapman in August 1984, and at Wednesday he regained his goal scoring form; between 1984 and 1988 Chapman scored 63 goals in 149 appearances. However, Wilkinson moved on to manage Leeds United in 1988, and on his departure Chapman moved on briefly to French side Chamois Niortais.

In October 1988, Brian Clough signed Chapman for Nottingham Forest. Chapman was an integral part of the Forest team that won the League Cup and Full Members Cup in 1989, scoring two goals in the latter's final. Chapman had a positive season in the league as Forest finished third, though they never looked likely to catch the leading pair of Arsenal (champions on goals scored) and runners-up Liverpool. However, Forest's failure to clinch the title in 1988–89 was not ultimately the end of Chapman's quest to be part of a title winning side.

In his time at the City Ground, Chapman was one of the Forest players who had to cope with the horrors of the Hillsborough disaster during the opening minutes of their FA Cup semi-final against Liverpool. Chapman played in the rescheduled game at Old Trafford, which Liverpool won 3–1. In January 1990, Howard Wilkinson paid Nottingham Forest £400,000 to recruit Chapman to Leeds United. Chapman was part of the Leeds team that won the Second Division title and promotion to the First Division in 1990. Leeds finished 4th in 1991, and 21-goal Chapman was one of the highest scorers in the league. He scored a hat-trick in a remarkable league match at Elland Road against Liverpool on 13 April 1991, though Leeds lost the game 5–4. This was the first time in a decade that a Leeds player had scored a top flight hat-trick (Leeds had been out of the First Division from 1982 until 1990).

In the 1991–92 season, Chapman scored 16 goals as Leeds won the last league title before the creation of the FA Premier League. His 16 goals in the club's title winning season included two league hat-tricks; the first in a 6–1 away win against his old club Sheffield Wednesday on 12 January 1992, the second on 14 March 1992 in a 5–1 home win over Wimbledon. Chapman scored the club's first two goals in the new league at the start of the 1992–93 season, scoring twice in a 2–1 home win over Wimbledon. Despite being the top scorer for Leeds in the 1992–93 season with 14 goals, Chapman was allowed to move to Portsmouth at the age of 33 for £250,000 on 11 August 1993.

Later career
Chapman made a Premier League comeback just four months after moving to Portsmouth when West Ham United signed him for £250,000 in September 1993. Making his West Ham debut along with other new signings Mike Marsh and David Burrows, Chapman scored in a 2–0 away win against Blackburn Rovers on 18 September 1993. He played 51 games in all competitions scoring 11 goals. He remained in the Premier League when he moved on to Ipswich for a fee of £70,000 in November 1994. He played one game on loan for Southend United in January 1995, scoring the consolation goal in the Shrimpers' 4–1 defeat at Grimsby Town.

During early 1996 he was loaned back to Leeds United where he played only two games. In his first, against one of his former sides, West Ham United, he was sent-off for elbowing defender Marc Rieper. He finished his UK career with Swansea. During the summer of 1996 he had a brief spell in Norway with Strømsgodset scoring one goal.

International career
Chapman was capped by both the England U21 and England B teams.

Personal life
He is the son of former Lincoln City, Port Vale and Chester striker Roy Chapman. Chapman is married to the actress Leslie Ash, with whom he owns two restaurants: So:uk in London and Teatro Leeds (in which one of his former clubs, Leeds United, is a shareholder). He previously owned another Teatro restaurant in London's Soho.

News of the World legal action

In 2011 Chapman and his wife, Leslie Ash, indicated that they were preparing to sue the News of the World for breach of privacy over suspicions that their voicemails, and those of their children, were illegally accessed by private investigator Glenn Mulcaire. After writing to the police over their suspicions, the police informed them that there were four pieces of paper referring to Ash in Mulcaire's notebooks, and five items relating to Chapman. There were further items relating to their children.

Career statistics
Source:

A.  The "Other" column constitutes appearances and goals in the Anglo-Italian Cup, FA Community Shield, Football League Trophy, Full Members Cup, UEFA Cup, UEFA Champions League.

Honours
Nottingham Forest
 Football League Cup: 1988-89, 1989-90
 Full Members Cup: 1988-89

Leeds United
 First Division: 1991–92
 Second Division: 1989–90
 FA Charity Shield: 1992

References

External links
 
 Lee Chapman career summary at leeds-fans.org.uk
 Player stats – Chamois Niortais

1959 births
Living people
Sportspeople from Lincoln, England
English footballers
English expatriate footballers
England B international footballers
England under-21 international footballers
Arsenal F.C. players
Nottingham Forest F.C. players
Plymouth Argyle F.C. players
Chamois Niortais F.C. players
Leeds United F.C. players
Portsmouth F.C. players
Ipswich Town F.C. players
Sheffield Wednesday F.C. players
Southend United F.C. players
Stoke City F.C. players
Strømsgodset Toppfotball players
Sunderland A.F.C. players
Swansea City A.F.C. players
West Ham United F.C. players
Premier League players
English Football League players
Eliteserien players
Association football forwards
Expatriate footballers in Norway
English restaurateurs